Prathista is a Telugu actress who primarily acted in Telugu movies. She rose to fame when she acted in the remake of 1972 Malayalam movie Rasaleela of the same name.

Her list of prominent Telugu movies include 
Swapna Sundari, To Let, Aata Modalaindi, and Chethilo Cheyyesi.

References

Indian film actresses
Actresses in Telugu cinema
Living people
Year of birth missing (living people)